Cranbourne railway station is the terminus of the suburban electrified Cranbourne line in Victoria, Australia. It serves the south-eastern Melbourne suburb of Cranbourne, and it opened on 1 October 1888.

History

Cranbourne station opened on 1 October 1888 as a station on the South Gippsland line that, until 24 July 1993, was serviced by V/Line services to Leongatha. Like the suburb itself, the station gets its name from the "Cranbourne Inn", founded by the Ruffy brothers, who were early settlers in the area. The name comes from either a town in Berkshire, England, or was named after Viscount Cranborne.

Between March 1920 and June 1956, trains regularly operated from a series of sidings about a mile south of the station, dispatching between ten and thirty trucks per week loaded with locally mined construction-quality sand.

In 1959, flashing light signals were provided at the former South Gippsland Highway level crossing, which was located at the Down end of the station.

In early 1973, a water tank that was located within the former train yard was removed.

In 1981, flashing light signals were provided at the Camms Road level crossing, located nearby in the Up direction of the station. Boom barriers were provided during the electrification of the line.

In November 1993, Train Order Working replaced Electric Staff safeworking to Cranbourne, then on 24 March 1995, the electrification and power signalling on the line was commissioned from Dandenong. Prior to electrification, the original station building was removed on 8 February 1994 by the Mornington Railway Preservation Society, whilst the former goods shed and a number of tracks were removed by August of that year.

The last regular train operated beyond Cranbourne on 15 January 1998, when the Koala Siding (near Nyora) to Spotswood sand train ceased operation.

In April 2008, work started on the construction of six train stabling sidings at the station, to enable more trains to run on the line at peak times without duplicating the line. The works were completed in November of that year. As part of these works, the station and bus interchange received an upgrade.

As part of the Liberal – National Coalition's 2018 State Election campaign, a pledge was made to extend the Cranbourne line to the suburb of Clyde.

On 30 November 2018, the Level Crossing Removal Project announced that the Camms Road level crossing would be grade-separated. On 25 June 2021, designs for the level crossing were released. It will involve raising Camms Road over the railway line via an overpass.

The Level Crossing Removal Project was also involved in the process of duplicating the railway line between Cranbourne and Dandenong. Major works started in 2020, and was completed by 13 February 2022, a year ahead of schedule. The duplication also involved a new timetable for the Cranbourne line, with services operating roughly every 10 minutes during the morning peak-hour.

Facilities, platforms and services

Cranbourne has one island platform with two faces. The station building features a customer service window, two enclosed waiting rooms and toilets. It is serviced by Metro Trains' Cranbourne line services.

Platform 1:
  all stations and limited express services to Flinders Street; all stations shuttle services to Dandenong

Platform 2:
  all stations and limited express services to Flinders Street; all stations shuttle services to Dandenong

By late 2025, it is planned that trains on the Cranbourne line will be through-routed with those on the Sunbury line, via the new Metro Tunnel.

Transport links

Cranbourne Transit operates eight routes via Cranbourne station, under contract to Public Transport Victoria:
 : to Frankston station
 : to Pearcedale
 : to Warneet
 : to Clyde
 : Cranbourne Park Shopping Centre – Selandra Rise (Cranbourne East)
 : Cranbourne Park Shopping Centre – Dandenong station
 : Clyde North – Lynbrook station (via Cranbourne Park Shopping Centre)
 : to Cranbourne East

Ventura Bus Lines operates three routes via Cranbourne station, under contract to Public Transport Victoria:
 : to Seaford station
 : Narre Warren North – Cranbourne
  : Dandenong station – Cranbourne (Saturday and Sunday mornings only)

References

External links
 
 Melway map

Premium Melbourne railway stations
Railway stations in Melbourne
Railway stations in Australia opened in 1888
Railway stations in the City of Casey